The Cypress Avenue station is a local station on the IRT Pelham Line of the New York City Subway. It is served by the 6 train at all times and is located at the intersection of Cypress Avenue and East 138th Street in the Mott Haven neighborhood of the Bronx. The station opened in 1919 as part of an extension of the Pelham Line of the Interborough Rapid Transit Company, and had its platforms extended in the 1960s.

History 
This station opened on January 7, 1919, as part of the extension of the Pelham Line from Third Avenue–138th Street to Hunts Point Avenue by the Interborough Rapid Transit Company.

Both platforms were extended at either ends in the 1960s to accommodate the current standard length of an IRT train. The extensions are noticeable as they are narrower than the rest of the platforms, have no columns, and the trim line is green with "CYPRESS AVE" in white sans serif font. The extensions result in the platforms being slightly offset.

Station layout

This underground station has three tracks and two side platforms. The center express track is used by the weekday peak direction <6> service.

Both platforms have their original Dual Contracts mosaic trim line and name tablets. "C" tablets for "Cypress" run along the trim line at regular intervals and the name tablets have "CYPRESS AVE." in serif, all-caps lettering. Dark yellow i-beam columns run along the platforms at regular intervals with every other one having the standard black name plate with white lettering.

There are no crossovers or crossunders to allow free transfers between directions. There is a closed newsstand that has been tiled over. Only the northbound platform has a station agent booth.

Exits
Both platforms have one same-level fare control area at the east (railroad north) end. Each one has a turnstile bank, token booth, and two street stairs. The ones on the Pelham Bay Park-bound platform go up to the south side of East 138th Street between Cypress and Jackson Avenues while the ones on the Manhattan-bound platform go up to the north side.

References

External links 

 
 Station Reporter — 6 Train
 The Subway Nut — Cypress Avenue Pictures 
 Cypress Avenue entrance from Google Maps Street View
 Platforms from Google Maps Street View

IRT Pelham Line stations
New York City Subway stations in the Bronx
Railway stations in the United States opened in 1919
Mott Haven, Bronx